Friend is an unincorporated community in Wasco County in the U.S. state of Oregon. Considered a ghost town, little remains of the community except the Friend Store, a one-room schoolhouse, and a cemetery.

Friend was named after George J. Friend. The first post office in the community, established in 1903, was on his homestead.

Friend was the end of the line on the Great Southern Railroad.  The line was built in 1908 from Dufur, which connected to The Dalles.  The depot was closed and service ended on January 5, 1928; the line was abandoned in 1935. Few signs of the track still exist.

See also
List of ghost towns in Oregon

References

External links
Image of Friend, Oregon schoolhouse
Historic image of abandoned building in Friend from Salem Public Library

Ghost towns in Oregon
Populated places established in 1903
Unincorporated communities in Wasco County, Oregon
1903 establishments in Oregon
Unincorporated communities in Oregon